The Danava dynasty was the first legendary line of rulers in Pragjyotisha, established by Mahiranga Danava. The dynasty was of Kirata origin. These rulers are mentioned in the Kalika Purana but there are no archaeological evidence to support this.

The Danava dynasty consisted of Kirata chiefs; the last of whom, Ghatakasura, was killed and replaced by Naraka.

Chronology

Notes

References 

 

Kingdoms of Assam
Mythological kingdoms, empires, and countries

ja:ダーナヴァ